WYMX (99.1 FM, "Max 99") is a classic hits formatted radio station licensed to Greenwood, Mississippi, United States.  The station is currently owned by Telesouth Communications.

Programming
Programming includes Charlie in the Morning, and football from Ole Miss and Pillow Academy.

History
For many years the station was branded Max 99.1, but became Bob FM on July 31, 2006. It recently reverted to a hot AC format as Max 99.

References

External links
Official Website
YMX
Classic hits radio stations in the United States